Nafisa Ali  (born 18 January 1957) is an Indian actress and politician from All India Trinamool Congress and a social activist.

Early life
Nafisa Ali was born in Kolkata, the daughter of Ahmed Ali, a Bengali Muslim man and Philomena Torresan, a Roman Catholic woman of Anglo-Indian heritage. Nafisa's paternal grandfather, S. Wajid Ali, was a prominent Bengali writer. Her paternal aunt (father's sister) was Zaib-un-Nissa Hamidullah, a Pakistani journalist and feminist. Nafisa is also related to the decorated Bangladeshi freedom fighter and soldier Bir Pratik Akhtar Ahmed. Nafisa's mother is now settled in Australia.

Nafisa went to Sr. Cambridge from La Martiniere Calcutta. She has also studied Vedanta taught by Swami Chinmayananda, who started the center Chinmaya Mission of World Understanding.

Her husband is the polo player and Arjuna awardee, retired Col R.S. Sodhi. After marriage, she chose to stop working and focus on her three children: daughters Armana, Pia and son Ajit. After a break of 18 years she returned to the film industry.

Career

Nafisa Ali has accomplishments in several fields. She was the national swimming champion from 1972 to 1974. In 1976, she won the Femina Miss India title, represented India at the Miss International contest & was declared the 2nd runner-up. Ali was also a jockey at the Calcutta Gymkhana in 1979.

Acting career

She has acted in several Bollywood films, the notable ones being Junoon (1978) with Shashi Kapoor, Major Saab with Amitabh Bachchan (1998), Bewafaa (2005), Life In A... Metro (2007) and Yamla Pagla Deewana (2010) with Dharmendra.

She has also acted in a Malayalam film called Big B (2007) with Mammootty, and is associated with Action India, an organisation working to spread AIDS awareness.

Political career

Nafisa Ali contested the 2004 Lok Sabha elections unsuccessfully from South Kolkata. On 5 April 2009, she contested the Lok Sabha election from Lucknow on the Samajwadi Party ticket after Sanjay Dutt's disqualification by the Supreme court on the basis of a prior conviction. She then rejoined the Indian National Congress party in November 2009 and said she is returning to Congress for life.
However, she joined the All India Trinamool Congress in October 2021 ahead of the 2022 Goa Legislative Assembly election.

Personal life
She is married to Colonel Ravinder Singh Sodhi a polo player who won the Arjuna Award.

In September 2005, she was appointed the chairperson of the Children's Film Society of India (CFSI).

In November 2018, Ali was diagnosed with stage 3 peritoneal and ovarian cancer.

Filmography

 Junoon (1979)
 Aatank (1996)
 Major Saab (1998)
  Yeh Zindagi Ka Safar (2001)
 Bewafaa (2005)
 Big B (2007) as Mary Teacher 
 Life in a... Metro (2008)
 Guzaarish (2010)
 Lahore (2010)
 Yamla Pagla Deewana (2011)
 Saheb, Biwi Aur Gangster 3 (2018) as Rajmata Yashodhara
  Bilal (2022) as Mary Teacher
 Uunchai (2022)

See also
 List of Indian women athletes page

References

External links

An interview with Nafisa Ali
A write-up on Nafisa Ali
Nafeesa Ali's website

La Martiniere Calcutta alumni
Indian actor-politicians
Miss International 1976 delegates
Indian female swimmers
Living people
1956 births
Women in Maharashtra politics
Indian film actresses
Actresses from Mumbai
Indian sportsperson-politicians
Actresses in Hindi cinema
Indian human rights activists
20th-century Indian actresses
21st-century Indian actresses
Sportswomen from Maharashtra
20th-century Indian women
Sportspeople from Mumbai
Indian women activists
Indian National Congress politicians from Maharashtra
21st-century Indian women politicians
21st-century Indian politicians
Equestrians from Maharashtra
Swimmers from Mumbai
Actresses in Malayalam cinema
Beauty queen-politicians